Geoffrey Oryema (16 April 1953 – 22 June 2018) 
was a Ugandan musician. In 1977 after the murder of his father, Erinayo Wilson Oryema, who was a cabinet minister in the government of Idi Amin, he began his life in exile. At the age of 24, and at the height of Amin's power, Oryema was smuggled out of the country in the trunk of a car.

He sang in the languages of his youth, Swahili and Acholi, the languages of his lost country, the "clear green land" of Uganda, and he also sang in English and French.

Oryema earned his international reputation on the release of his second album, Beat the Border. He had collaborated with Peter Gabriel, Brian Eno and others, and was backed by French musicians including Jean-Pierre Alarcen (guitar) and Patrick Buchmann (drums, percussion, backing vocals), touring with WOMAD in Australia, the USA, Japan, Brazil and Europe. In 1994 the band performed at Woodstock 94 celebrating the 25th anniversary of the legendary festival.

Gabriel's record label, Real World, helped with the first three of Oryema's albums, before his move to Sony International, a label established in France, where Oryema had lived since his exile.

In July 2005, he performed at the LIVE 8: Africa Calling concert in Cornwall, and with 1 Giant Leap at the Live 8 Edinburgh concert.

He resided in Paris, France, until his death. His ashes were delivered to Anaka.

Discography
 Exile (1990)
 Beat the Border (1993)
 Night to Night (1996)
 Spirit (2000)
 The Odysseus/Best Of (2002)
 Words (2004)
  From The Heart (Released on Long Tale Recordings) (2010)

References

External links
 Official Website
 Long Tale Recordings
 Yahoo! Music Biography
 Biography
 Real World: Geoffrey Oryema: Night To Night
 A conversation with Geoffrey Oryema, an interview by Opiyo Oloya
 Biography at World Music Central 

1953 births
2018 deaths
Acholi people
Ugandan musicians
Real World Records artists
Ugandan exiles
Swahili-language singers
People from Soroti District